The 2024 United States House of Representatives elections in Michigan will be held on November 5, 2024, to elect the 13 U.S. Representatives from the state of Michigan, one from each of the state's congressional districts. The elections will coincide with the U.S. presidential election, as well as other elections to the House of Representatives, elections to the United States Senate, and various state and local elections.

District 1 

The 1st district covers the Upper Peninsula and the northern part of the Lower Peninsula, including Traverse City. The incumbent is Republican Jack Bergman, who was re-elected with 60.0% of the vote in 2022.

Republican primary

Potential 
 Jack Bergman, incumbent U.S. Representative

Democratic primary

Declared 
 Bob Lorinser, physician and nominee for this district in 2022

General election

Predictions

District 3 

The 3rd district is based in western Michigan, and includes Grand Rapids, Muskegon, and parts of Ottawa County. The incumbent is Democrat Hillary Scholten, who flipped the district and was elected with 54.9% of the vote in 2022.

Democratic primary

Potential 
 Hillary Scholten, incumbent U.S. Representative

Republican primary

Potential 
 Peter Meijer, former U.S. Representative

General election

Predictions

District 4 

The 4th district is based in southwestern Michigan, and includes the cities of Kalamazoo and Holland. The incumbent is Republican Bill Huizenga was re-elected with 54.4% of the vote in 2022. He has expressed interest in running for U.S. Senate to succeed Debbie Stabenow.

Republican primary

Potential 
 Bill Huizenga, incumbent U.S. Representative

General election

Predictions

District 7 

The 7th district is based around the Lansing–East Lansing metropolitan area, but also includes Livingston County and a small part of Oakland County. The incumbent is Democrat Elissa Slotkin, who was re-elected with 51.7% of the vote in 2022. She is not seeking re-election, instead choosing to run for U.S. Senate to succeed Debbie Stabenow.

Democratic primary

Publicly expressed interest 
Sarah Anthony, state senator
Julie Brixie, state representative
Barbara Byrum, Ingham County Clerk and former state representative

Potential 
Jennifer Conlin, state representative
Emily Dievendorf, state representative
Curtis Hertel Jr., former state senator
Kara Hope, state representative
Angela Witwer, state representative

Declined 
Andy Schor, mayor of Lansing
Sam Singh, state senator
Elissa Slotkin, incumbent U.S. Representative (running for U.S. Senate)

Republican primary

Declared 
 Tom Barrett, former state senator for the 24th district and nominee for this district in 2022

Potential 
Brian Begole, state representative
Bob Bezotte, state representative
Graham Filler, state representative
Roger Hauck, state senator
Gina Johnsen, state representative
Lana Theis, state senator

Declined 
Mike Bishop, former U.S. Representative

General election

Predictions

District 8 

The 8th district centers around the Saginaw Bay and includes the cities of Flint, Saginaw, Bay City, and Midland. The incumbent is Democrat Dan Kildee, who was re-elected with 53.1% of the vote in 2022.

Democratic primary

Potential 
 Dan Kildee, incumbent U.S. Representative

Republican primary

Potential 
 Bill G. Schuette, state representative from the 95th district and son of former Michigan Attorney General Bill Schuette

General election

Predictions

District 9 

The 9th district is based in The Thumb region, including Port Huron as well as the northern Detroit exurbs in Oakland and Macomb counties. The incumbent is Republican Lisa McClain, who was re-elected with 63.9% of the vote in 2022. She has expressed interest in running for U.S. Senate to succeed Debbie Stabenow.

Republican primary

Potential 
 Lisa McClain, incumbent U.S. Representative

General election

Predictions

District 10 

The 10th district is based primarily in southeastern Michigan's Macomb County, taking in Warren and Sterling Heights, as well as a small portion of eastern Oakland County. The incumbent is Republican John James, who was elected with 48.8% of the vote in 2022.

Republican primary

Declared 
 John James, incumbent U.S. Representative

Democratic primary

Potential 
 Andy Levin, former U.S. Representative for the 9th district
 Carl Marlinga, former Macomb County Circuit Court Judge and nominee for this district in 2022

General election

Predictions

District 13 

The 13th district is based solely in Wayne County and includes most of Detroit and the cities of Taylor and Romulus. The incumbent is Democrat Shri Thanedar, who was elected with 71.1% of the vote in 2022.

Democratic primary

Potential 
 John Conyers III, hedge fund manager, son of former U.S. Representative John Conyers, and candidate in 2022
 Shri Thanedar, incumbent U.S. Representative

General election

Predictions

References 

2024
Michigan
United States House of Representatives